Bolot Feray, is a 1995 Seychellois comedy film directed by Jean-Claude Matombe and produced by Marie-Therese Choppy. The film stars Alain Belle in the titular role with Charles DeCommarmond, Jenita Furneau, Antonia Gabriel and Marie Lista in supportive roles. It is based on a play and shows traditional Seychellois society.

The film received positive reviews and is considered as one of best Seychellois movies. The play was originally written by Geva René.

Cast
 Alain Belle as Bolot Feray
 Charles DeCommarmond as Uncle Sarl
 Jenita Furneau as Mari
 Antonia Gabriel as Pierreline
 Marie Lista as Poupet

References

External links
 

1995 films
1995 comedy films
Seychellois films